A. J. Tyronne Benildus Fernando (born 8 May 1969) is a Sri Lankan athlete. He competed in the men's long jump at the 1996 Summer Olympics.

References

External links
 

1969 births
Living people
Athletes (track and field) at the 1996 Summer Olympics
Sri Lankan male long jumpers
Olympic athletes of Sri Lanka
Place of birth missing (living people)